The Robert D. Moore House, located in Bend, Oregon, is a house listed on the National Register of Historic Places.

See also
 National Register of Historic Places listings in Deschutes County, Oregon

References

Houses on the National Register of Historic Places in Bend, Oregon
1921 establishments in Oregon
Houses completed in 1921
Colonial Revival architecture in Oregon